Deon Kraemer is a South African rugby league player for the Tuks Bulls. His position is hooker. He is a South African international, and has played in the 2013 Rugby League World Cup qualifying against Jamaica and the USA.

References

Kraemer
Kraemer
Tuks Bulls players
Rugby league hookers